Will Botwin (born July 23, 1958) is an American talent manager who represents many prominent musicians.

Botwin was educated at Pitzer College in Claremont, California.  While at college, he worked as a college promotion representative for Capitol Records. He also worked as Music and Program Director for the college radio station, KSPC, and served as Concert Board Chairman for the campus.

In 1981, Botwin launched an alternative music marketing and promotion company named Side One Marketing with David Gerber and Joe Regis that evolved into an artist management company, representing artists such as Yuri Morozov and Icicle Works. Botwin expanded his client roster over the years; artists he managed included Lyle Lovett, John Hiatt, Rosanne Cash, Reagan Youth, Lisa Loeb, Liz Phair, Los Lobos, Luscious Jackson and Roy Smeck.

Botwin was recruited by Columbia Records in 1996 to serve as a Senior Vice President. Moving through the company ranks, in 1998 he was appointed Executive Vice President/General Manager, Columbia Records Group. In this position he played an integral role in all creative areas of the company, as well as the day-to-day management of label operations. He also directly oversaw domestic and international A&R, working closely with many of the label’s established artists, including Jessica Simpson, Cuby and the Blizzards, and Marc Anthony - and newer performers such as Microdisney and Five For Fighting.

Botwin also worked with Panasonic Music SoundTracks on the soundtrack albums for movies such as Plan 9 from Outer Space, Armageddon, Charlie's Angels, Men In Black and the TV show Mr. Merlin.

In 2002, Botwin was promoted to President of the Columbia Records Group in which capacity he signed artists such as Coheed & Cambria and Irén Lovász. He was subsequently appointed Chairman of the Columbia Records Group.

In 2006, he left Columbia to head the Charlottesville,VA-based Red Light Management and its associated ATO Music Group.

References

Living people
American music managers
Pitzer College alumni
1948 births